The British Retail Consortium (or BRC) is a trade association for retail businesses in the United Kingdom.

History
The British Retail Consortium was formed in January 1992 with the merger of the British Retailers' Association and the Retail Consortium. In 1998 it produced the first edition of the BRC Food Technical Standard and Protocol for food suppliers. This has been widely adopted not just throughout the UK but around the world.

BRC went on to produce other global standards, which became a separate brand that were sold to the LGC Group in 2016.

Functions
It campaigns for the retail industry and is the authoritative voice of retail, recognised for its powerful campaigning and influence within government and as a provider of in-depth retail information. The BRC leads the industry and works with their members to tell the story of retail, shape debates and influence issues and opportunities which will help make that positive difference. Their work represents the careers of people who work in the industry, the communities retail touches and competitiveness as a fundamental principle of the industry’s success.

Campaigns
The BRC has backed a Private Members’ Bill that aims to protect shop workers and deter criminals by introducing stronger criminal penalties for offenders attacking shop workers and reviewing the sentencing guidelines for assault.

References

External links 
 
 BRC Global Standards

Consortia in the United Kingdom
Food safety in the United Kingdom
Trade associations based in the United Kingdom
Organisations based in the London Borough of Southwark
Organizations established in 1992
1992 establishments in the United Kingdom
Retail trade associations
Retailing in the United Kingdom